Wloka may refer to:

 Hans Wloka (1925–1976), German footballer
 Hans-Jürgen Wloka (born 1951), German football player
 Anna Wloka (born 1993), Polish athlete
 Wólka, Polish name for Volok (unit), obsolete unit of land measurement

See also 

 Wólka (Polish placenames)
  means trawling
  means "girl, young woman"
 Walka

References 

Polish-language surnames